Knut Heyerdahl-Larsen (11 October 1887 – 28 May 1969) was a Norwegian footballer. He played in one match for the Norway national football team in 1910.

References

External links
 

1887 births
1969 deaths
Norwegian footballers
Norway international footballers
Place of birth missing
Association footballers not categorized by position